The William Harris Homestead, in Campton, Georgia dates from 1825.  It was listed on the National Register of Historic Places (NRHP) in 1982. 
Its NRHP listing was for a  property that included a residential dwelling, agricultural outbuildings, agricultural fields, and secondary structure(s).  Specifically seven contributing buildings and eight contributing sites are included.

It is listed for architectural criteria.

The William Harris Homestead webpage describes it as being located in Monroe, Georgia, but its location appears to be about one mile north of the small community of Campton.  Monroe is a larger town about five miles further south of Campton.

The William Harris Homestead Foundation, a charitable 501(c)3 organization, manages the property and conducts public tours and events including school field trips.

References

External links
Harris Homestead.Com

Houses on the National Register of Historic Places in Georgia (U.S. state)
Houses completed in 1825
Houses in Walton County, Georgia
National Register of Historic Places in Walton County, Georgia